The 2009 James Madison Dukes football team represented James Madison University in the 2009 NCAA Division I FCS football season. JMU finished the season 6–5 with a record of 4–4 in the Colonial Athletic Association.

Schedule

References

James Madison
James Madison Dukes football seasons
James Madison Dukes football